Kar Salar (also Romanized as Kār Sālār; also known as Kārsūlār) is a village in Sorkhkola Rural District, in the Central District of Savadkuh County, Mazandaran Province, Iran. At the 2006 census, its population was 183, in 47 families.

References 

Populated places in Savadkuh County